105.3 Super Tunog Pinoy (DZCT 105.3 MHz) is an FM station owned and operated by DCG Radio-TV Network. Its studios and transmitter are located at 1022 DCG Tower 1, Maharlika Hi-Way, Brgy. Isabang, Tayabas

History
2009 - Radio City was inaugurated. It was formerly owned by Kaissar Broadcasting Network and operated by Southern Tagalog Sweet Life.
September 2014 - Katigbak Enterprises acquired the station and became a relay of Retro 105.9 in Manila. Radio City moved to 97.5 a week later.
June 2017 - It went off the air.
January 2018 - Super Tunog Pinoy was launched with an all-OPM format.

References

External links
Super Tunog Pinoy FB Page

Radio stations in Lucena, Philippines
Radio stations established in 2009